Hard Hunted is a 1992 action/adventure film starring Dona Speir, Roberta Vasquez,  Cynthia Brimhall, Bruce Penhall and Geoffrey Moore. It was directed and written by Andy Sidaris. It's the seventh installment in the Triple B series.

Outline
Martin Kane smuggles a nuclear trigger out of China and agrees to sell it to a terrorist in the Middle East. The US Intelligence Services send a special undercover agent to steal the device from Kane, but she fails and is found murdered. A team of three further agents, Donna Hamilton, Nicole Justin, and Edy Stark, is then sent in to try to retrieve the situation, fighting a gang of hi-tech smugglers with a deadly array of weaponry and erotic charms.

Cast

See also
Girls with guns

External links

 

1992 films
1990s action adventure films
1990s spy action films
American spy action films
Films directed by Andy Sidaris
American action adventure films
1990s English-language films
1990s American films